Yrjö Antti Linko (1 February 1885 – 22 March 1934) was a Finnish gymnast who won bronze at the 1908 Summer Olympics.

Gymnastics 

He won the Finnish national championship in team gymnastics as a member of Ylioppilasvoimistelijat in 1909.

Biography 

His parents were senior conductor A. G. Lindholm and Edla Johanna Fredberg. He finnicized his familyname from Lindholm to Linko in 1906. He married Hilja Linnéa Knutsson (1892–) in 1914.

He did his matriculation exam in 1905. He graduated as a physiotherapist and a physical education teacher in 1911. He obtained the degree of Licentiate of Medicine in 1913.

He worked as a physician in various places of employment from 1911 and as a physical education teacher in 1912–1913.

He served as a physician in the White Guard during and after the Finnish Civil War, reaching the rank of captain (med.) in 1921.

He was awarded the Cross of Liberty, 4th Class and the Commemorative medal of Liberation war.

He died of pneumonia.

References 

1885 births
1934 deaths
Finnish male artistic gymnasts
Gymnasts at the 1908 Summer Olympics
Olympic gymnasts of Finland
Olympic bronze medalists for Finland
Olympic medalists in gymnastics
Medalists at the 1908 Summer Olympics
20th-century Finnish people